Bosara bursacristata is a moth in the family Geometridae. It is found on Borneo. The habitat consists of lower and upper montane zones at altitudes between 1,000 and 2,110 meters.

The length of the forewings is 7–8 mm.

References

Moths described in 1997
Eupitheciini
Moths of Indonesia